Kamskaya Peak is, at , the highest peak of Dekefjellet Mountain in the Weyprecht Mountains of Queen Maud Land, Antarctica. It was discovered and plotted from air photos by the Third German Antarctic Expedition, 1938–39, and was mapped from air photos and surveys by the Sixth Norwegian Antarctic Expedition, 1956–60. it was remapped by the Soviet Antarctic Expedition, 1960–61, and possibly named after the Kama River in Russia.

References

Mountains of Queen Maud Land
Princess Astrid Coast